Hasan Murad (born 1 July 2001) is a Bangladeshi cricketer. He made his Twenty20 debut for Bangladesh Krira Shikkha Protishtan in the 2018–19 Dhaka Premier Division Twenty20 Cricket League on 25 February 2019. He made his List A debut for Bangladesh Krira Shikkha Protishtan in the 2018–19 Dhaka Premier Division Cricket League on 8 March 2019. He was the leading wicket-taker for Bangladesh Krira Shikkha Protishtan in the 2018–19 Dhaka Premier Division Cricket League tournament, with 22 dismissals in 13 matches. In December 2019, he was named in Bangladesh's squad for the 2020 Under-19 Cricket World Cup.

He made his first-class debut for Chittagong Division in the 2020–21 National Cricket League on 22 March 2021.

References

External links
 

2001 births
Living people
Bangladeshi cricketers
Bangladesh Krira Shikkha Protishtan cricketers
Chittagong Division cricketers
People from Cox's Bazar District